Samuel Reid Spencer Jr. (June 6, 1919 – October 16, 2013) was an American academic administrator who served as the 14th president of Davidson College from 1968 to 1983.

Early life and education 
Originally from South Carolina, Spencer graduated from Davidson in 1940, then serving in the United States Army during World War II. After the war, he earned a PhD from Harvard University.

Career 
Afterward, Spencer returned to his alma mater to serve as an assistant to then-president John Rood Cunningham, while also becoming a professor of history. Spencer left Davidson to become president of Mary Baldwin College, returning as president in 1968.

As president, Spencer led Davidson's successful attempt to become a co-educational institution. He also focused on minority student recruitment and retention and expanded the endowment. Spencer was also appointed by President Jimmy Carter to the Board of Foreign Scholarships, which oversees the Fulbright Program.

After leaving Davidson, Spencer became the president of the Virginia Foundation of Independent Colleges.

References

External links 
 Biography from the Davidson College Archives & Special Collections

Harvard University alumni
1919 births
2013 deaths
Davidson College alumni
Presidents of Davidson College
People from Rock Hill, South Carolina
People from Davidson, North Carolina